Saraguro is the capital of Saraguro Canton in Loja Province, Ecuador.

Saraguro may also refer to:
Saraguro Canton, Ecuador
Saraguro people, an indigenous people of Ecuador